Television in Kosovo was first introduced in 1974. The Radio Television of Pristina was the first Albanian-speaking broadcaster in Kosovo, founded in 1974 following Radio Pristina's foundation in 1945. It was forcefully shut down in 1990 by the Yugoslavian government, forbidding the flow of information through Kosovan airwaves during the Kosovo War. In wartime, the information blackout was covered by Radio 21 (in exile via internet radio and the BBC World Service) and Koha Ditore (via its newspaper and an English-language website), while television was under the sole ownership of the Radio Television of Serbia.

In 1999, the Radio Television of Pristina reopened and was transformed into the Radio Television of Kosovo (RTK), thanks to help from foreign countries. Besides RTK, the end of the war brought along the creation of national television networks such as Kohavision (a sister to Koha Ditore), RTV21 (a sister to Radio 21), and many others. In the mid-2000s, RTK partnered with IPTV companies like TVALB to expand its coverage to countries in Europe and North America. These efforts would go further in 2009 with RTV21's 21WorldTV cable service, which offered services to Albanians in the United States. For most of Kosovo's history in television, RTK, RTV21, and Kohavision are the most watched broadcasters in the country.:21

The introduction of cable television through ISPs greatly increased the capacity of television coverage starting in the 2010s with companies bringing programming from Albania and foreign channels to Kosovo. According to a 2013 study by the Independent Media Commission, more than half of Kosovo receives their television signal through cable.:18

Below is a list of television networks and channels with national, regional and cable coverage in Kosovo.

National frequency

Public
RTK 1
RTK 2
RTK 3
RTK 4

Private
RTV21
Kohavision
Klan Kosova
T7
ATV
Kanal 10
RTV Dukagjini
Zëri TV
Tëvë 1 
First Channel
Arta TV
Zico TV

Regional frequency
TV Tema
RTV Besa
TV Prizreni
Opinion TV
Televizioni Syri 
TV Llapi
TV Vali
TV Liria
TV Festina
TV Mitrovica
Puls TV
Dasma TV
TV Diaspora
ON TV
A-Mol TV
TV Iliria

Defunct 
 Top Kosova
 3TV
News TV
Click Channel
Kosova Channel
TV Skenderaj
Visa Channel
Pro Channel
Metro TV
Herc TV
Kutia TV
3+HD Music
Men TV
ART
Next TV
TV Glob
Olti TV
RTV Fan
RTV Balkan
TV Most
A9TV

Company 21
RTV21 HD (Kosovo)
TV 21 HD (North Macedonia)
21 Plus HD
21 Popullore HD
21 Mix HD
21 Junior HD
21 Business HD
21 News HD

Artmotion
ArtKino 1
ArtKino 2
ArtKino 3
ArtDoku 1
ArtDoku 2
ArtSport 1
ArtSport 2
ArtSport 3
ArtSport 4
ArtSport 5
ArtSport 6
Gurmania
Episode
PRIME
Beat TV 
Prince Kids

Kujtesa

Active
K Sport 1
K Sport 2
K Sport 3
K Sport 4
K Sport 5

Defunct
K Channel HD
K Film Një HD
K Film Dy HD
K Film Tre
K Film Katër
K Film Pesë
K Doku Një
K Doku Dy
K Reality
K Sofia (now under Digicable as "Sofia")
K Music HD

TelKos

TëVë 1
TëVë Aksion
TëVë Comedy
TëVë Drame
TëVë Fantasy
TëVë Novela
TëVë Shqip
TëVë Kids 1
TëVë Kids 2 
TëVë Doku 1 
TëVë Doku 2

SuperSport

SuperSport Kosova 1
SuperSport Kosova 2
SuperSport Kosova 3
SuperSport 1
SuperSport 2
SuperSport 3
SuperSport 4
SuperSport 5
SuperSport 6
SuperSport 7

SPI International
FilmBox
FilmBox Extra
FilmBox Plus
FilmBox Arthouse
FightBox
DocuBox
Fast&FunBox
FashionBox
GameToonBox

Other channels
HBO
Fox
Fox Life
Fox Crime
Comedy Central Extra
Disney Channel
Nickelodeon
Nick Jr.
Cartoon Network
Boomerang
Baby TV
Duck TV
National Geographic
Discovery Channel
Investigation Discovery
Science Channel
Animal Planet
Travel Channel
History Channel
24Kitchen
Food Network
Alb'swissTV
All of Albania's channels

Cable networks
IPKO
Digitalb
Kujtesa
Telecom of Kosovo
ISP Broadcast
ArtMotion
Tring Digital
TelKos

Notes

References

External links
Independent Media Commission